Carolyn Ryan is an American journalist from Massachusetts.

She has worked at The Boston Globe, and the The Patriot Ledger, and has worked at The New York Times since 2007, currently as the managing editor.

Early life and education 
Ryan grew up in Massachusetts.

Ryan has a degree in English literature from Bates College, graduating in 1986.

Career 
Ryan is the managing editor of The New York Times having worked there since 2007. She previously worked as the deputy managing editor of The Boston Globe and prior to that, worked at The Patriot Ledger. 

In 2008, she co-led the team of journalists that won a 2009 Pulitzer Prize for Breaking News Reporting on the Eliot Spitzer prostitution scandal. In 2018, she won NLGJA: The Association of LGBTQ Journalists leadership award.

References

External links 
 Carolyn Ryan - Twitter

Year of birth missing (living people)
Living people
21st-century American women writers
21st-century American newspaper editors
The New York Times editors
Pulitzer Prize winners
Bates College alumni
American newspaper editors
Journalists from Massachusetts